Basketball is a sport played both indoors and outdoors in Australia. Basketball is the number two sport globally with over 200 countries participating and over 450 million players. According to research by Sweeney Sports, one in three Australians has an interest in basketball. Furthermore, basketball is played by approximately one million men, women, boys, and girls throughout Australia. According to Basketball Australia, as of March 2014, basketball is the second highest team participation sport in Australia.

Basketball in Australia experienced a golden age in the mid-1980s to the mid-1990s, during which the National Basketball League saw its halcyon days. However, its popularity, media attention, attendance, and corporate support deteriorated during the 2000s. Despite this, figures released by the Australian Sports Commission's Exercise, Recreation and Sport Survey in 2010 showed that basketball was the most popular sport played in the state of Victoria.

History
The first press reference to a game of basketball in Australia is from The Adelaide Advertiser. The paper reported on Wednesday 17 February 1897 that the following Tuesday at the opening of Our Boys Institute, said to be the largest gymnasium in the colonies, OBI would play YMCA in the first exhibition of basketball in South Australia. There is no evidence of any game being played earlier elsewhere, thus the first game of basketball was played in Australia on Tuesday 23 February 1897.  The game occurred six years after the invention of the sport on 21 December 1891 by Canadian James Naismith, a physical education professor and instructor at the International Young Men's Christian Association Training School (YMCA) in Springfield, Massachusetts. OBI and the YMCA continued to be at the forefront of the development of Adelaide basketball. More than 120 years later, basketball is one of the most popular participation sports in the country.

National League
The National Basketball League (NBL), which began in 1979, is the top-level men's basketball competition in Australia. The sport experienced rapid growth in the 1980s with the influx of American players. National competition became popular in the major cities. By the late 1990s, basketball in Australia went into sharp decline. According to Adelaide 36ers championship coach Phil Smyth, Australian basketball administrators rested on their laurels during the 1990s. "They let the brand get damaged," Smyth said. "It's that old saying 'if you keep doing the same thing over and over again hoping for a different result, you're a fool — and basketball was foolish." During the 2000s, interest in the NBL dwindled, with many teams folding, audience attendance fluctuating, and the league's TV presence inconsistent.

In 2015, a record number of Australians playing in the NBA led to a renewed popularity in the sport and showed Australians still loved basketball but were unsure about the national version.

National teams
The Boomers are the men's basketball team which represents Australia in international competitions. As of 2022, the Boomers have won 19 FIBA Oceania Championships (no longer contested), one FIBA Asia Cup, one Commonwealth Games Gold Medal in 2006 and one Bronze Medal at the Olympic Games in Tokyo 2020 Olympics, But not World Cup. Until winning the Bronze in Tokyo, their best finish being fourth place at the Olympics in 1988, 1996, 2000 and 2016, and fourth at the 2019 World Cup.

The women's national team is the Opals. They have won Olympic silver in 2000, 2004 and 2008, Olympic bronze in 1996 and 2012, as well as gold at the 2006 FIBA World Championship and bronze at the 1998, 2002 and 2014 World Cups.

League system 

Men

Women

See also

References

External links 
 Basketball Australia official website
 NBL official website
 WNBL official website